Events from the year 1868 in Germany.

Incumbents
 King of Bavaria – Ludwig II
 King of Prussia – William I
 King of Saxony – John
 King of Württemberg – Charles of Württemberg
 Grand Duke of Baden – Frederick I

Events
 28 January – The Leipzig Opera House is inaugurated. It was destroyed during the 1943 Bombing of Leipzig.
 8 March –  1868 Zollparlament election

Undated
 The Herrenhäuser Brewery is founded in Hanover
 The liberal German People's Party is founded

Births
 January 3 - Heinrich Brauns, German politician (died 1933)
 January 15 – Otto von Lossow, German general (died 1938)
 January 21 – Felix Hoffmann, German chemist (died 1946)
 March 1 - Alfred Henke, German politician (died 1946)
 March 4 -Friedrich Wilhelm Kopsch, German anatomist (died 1955)
 April 19 - Max von Schillings, German conductor (died 1933)
 May 13 - Otto Ritter von Dandl, German politician (died 1942)
 July 7 - Karl Bauer, German artist (died 1942)
 July 9 - Gustav Noske, German politician (died 1946)	
 July 12 - Stefan George, German poet (died 1933)	
 August 2 - Theodor Wolff, German writer and journalist (died 1943)
 August 10 - Paul Warburg, German/American banker (died 1932)
 September 23 - Johannes Bell, German politician (died 1949)	
 October 8 - Max Slevogt, German painter (died 1932)
 November 2 - Wilhelm Kolle, German bacteriologist (died 1935)
 November 8 - Felix Hausdorff, German mathematician (died 1942)	
 November 17 - Korbinian Brodmann, German neurologist and psychiatrist (died 1918)	
 November 17 - Paul Hirsch, German politician (died 1940)
 November 25 - Ernest Louis, Grand Duke of Hesse, German nobleman (died 1937)
 November 25 - Ernst Däumig, German politician (died 1922)	
 December 5 - Arnold Sommerfeld, German physicist (died 1951)
 December 9 - Fritz Haber, German chemist who received the Nobel Prize in Chemistry (died 1934)	
 December 24 - Richard Teichmann, German chess master (died 1925)
 December 24 - Emanuel Lasker, German mathematician (died 1941)

Deaths
 8 January - Adolf Heinrich von Arnim-Boitzenburg, German statesman and politician (born 1803)	
 16 January - Theodor Schönemann, German mathematician (born 1812)	
 23 January - Heinrich von Brandt, German general (born 1789)
 3 February - Karl Mathy, German politician (born 1807)
 29 February - Ludwig I of Bavaria, German king of Bavaria from 1825-1848 (born 1786)
 2 March - Carl Eberwein, German composer (born 1786)	
 22 May - Julius Plücker, German mathematician and physicist (born 1801)
 29 May - Julius Friedrich Heinrich Abegg, German criminalist (born 1796)
 18 July - Emanuel Leutze, German painter (born 1816), died in the United States
 21 July - Friedrich Wilhelm Schubert, German historian (born 1799)
 25 August – Charlotte Birch-Pfeiffer, German actress (born 1799)
 29 August - Christian Friedrich Schönbein, German chemist (born 1799)
 26 September - August Ferdinand Möbius, German mathematician (born 1790)
 6 December - August Schleicher, German linguist (born 1821)
 13 December - Carl Friedrich Philipp von Martius, German botanist and explorer (born 1794)

 
Years of the 19th century in Germany
Germany
Germany